The Berwinne is a small river in the north-eastern part of Belgium. It is a right-bank tributary to the Meuse river and flows over a distance of 31.9 kilometres (19.8 miles) through the provinces of Liège and Limburg. Its source is located in the eastern part of the municipality of Aubel, near the Henri-Chapelle American Cemetery and Memorial. From there the Berwinne river flows, generally spoken, in northwestern direction, through places like Val-Dieu Abbey, Dalhem and Moelingen, before joining the Meuse between Visé and the Dutch border.

Rivers of Belgium
Rivers of Limburg (Belgium)
Rivers of Liège Province
Aubel
Dalhem
Voeren